The Beaumont Open Invitational was a golf tournament on the PGA Tour that played for two years in the early 1960s at the Tyrrell Park Municipal Golf Course in Beaumont, Texas, an 18-hole, par-72, 6,656 yard city-owned course.

The 1961 event was won on November 12 by 26-year-old Joe Campbell by one stroke over Beaumont native Bert Weaver. This was his first PGA Tour win. The 1962 event was won on November 4 by 27-year-old Dave Ragan by three strokes over Dow Finsterwald, Don Massengale, and third round leader Lionel Hebert.

The winner's share was $2,800 out of a total purse of $20,000 in both years.

Winners

References

Former PGA Tour events
Golf in Texas